Ocho Cinco or OchoCinco is "eight five" in Spanish. It may refer to:

People
Chad Johnson, (born 1978), American football player in college and NFL known as Chad Ochocinco (also Ocho Cinco) during the period 2009 season to the 2011 for wearing the jersey 85 (ochocinco in Spanish)

Arts and entertainment
Ochocinco: The Ultimate Catch, American reality television series airing on VH1 starring wide receiver Chad Ochocinco (Chad Johnson)
"Ocho Cinco", track by French Montana featuring Diddy, Red Cafe, MGK and Los on French Montana 2012 album Mac & Cheese 3
"Ocho Cinco", track by DJ Snake featuring Yellow Claw in DJ Snake 2016 album Encore
"Ocho Cinco", track by M Huncho on 2019 mixtape Utopia